Siege of Takatenjin may refer to:
 Siege of Takatenjin (1574), 1574 siege of Takatenjin fortress, Tōtōmi Province, Japan
 Siege of Takatenjin (1581), 1581 siege of Takatenjin fortress, Tōtōmi Province, Japan